James Robert McMillin (September 18, 1937 – February 19, 2023) was an American professional football player who was a defensive back in the American Football League (AFL). He played for the Denver Broncos and Oakland Raiders. He played college football for the Colorado State Rams.

McMillin died on February 19, 2023, at the age of 85.

References

1937 births
2023 deaths
American football defensive backs
Denver Broncos (AFL) players
Oakland Raiders players
Colorado State Rams football players
People from Pleasant Hill, California
Players of American football from California
Sportspeople from the San Francisco Bay Area
American Football League players